The Bahraini opposition refers to a group of political groups who are opposed to the Cabinet of Bahrain government and the ruling monarch of the Sunni House of Khalifa. Currently, the Bahraini opposition can be divided into the officially registered political parties, who demand reforms to the current political system, and the unregistered opposition groups. Most of the opposition is comprised from the majority Shia population of Bahrain.

The alliance of registered opposition parties consists of:
Al Wefaq National Islamic Society (banned)
National Democratic Action Society (Wa'ad, banned)
Progressive Democratic Tribune
Islamic Action Society (Amal, banned)
Al Wahdawi
Al Ekha
Nationalist Democratic Assembly

The unlicensed opposition consists of:
Haq Movement
February 14 Youth Coalition
Al Wafa' Islamic Movement
Bahrain Freedom Movement
National Liberation Front – Bahrain
Al-Ashtar Brigades
Al-Mukhtar Brigades

Since the 2011 Bahraini uprising, all opposition parties have boycotted parliamentary elections. The opposition has since failed to overthrow the Cabinet of Bahrain.

See also
 Politics of Bahrain
 List of political parties in Bahrain

References

Bahraini democracy movements
Bahraini uprising of 2011
Bahrain

Politics of Bahrain